Something in the Air is an Australian television soap opera transmitted by the Australian Broadcasting Corporation between 2000 and 2002. It was one of the first programs in Australia that was filmed in widescreen. It won the AACTA Award for Best Television Drama Series in 2001.

The series initially screened four episodes weekly, Monday to Thursday at 6:30 pm and received moderate success. Ratings began to drop after the show was moved to Saturday evenings in which it was cut down to two episodes shown in a one-hour block. It later resumed its usual four-episode weekly run, however, it was screened in a 6:00 pm timeslot, putting it up against the higher rated Seven and Nine news bulletins, which ultimately led to its cancellation.

The series was repeated on the-then ABC2 from 11 February 2008.

Episodes

Cast
The cast of Something in the Air included:

 Eric Bana (Joe Sabatini, 2000–01)
 Ray Barrett (Len Taylor)
 Ulli Birvé (Helen Virtue)
 Alan Brough (Warren Brown, 2000)
 Danielle Carter (Sally Sabatini)
 Vince Colosimo (Joe Sabatini, 2001), replaced Eric Bana
 Martin Copping (Jimmy Hibberd, 2000)
 Kate Fitzpatrick (Julia Rutherford)
 Frankie J. Holden (Stuart McGregor)
 Melita Jurisic (Dr. Eva Petrovska)
 Colin Moody (Tom Dooley)
 Roger Oakley (Doug Rutherford)
 Anne Phelan (Monica Taylor)
 Sullivan Stapleton (Wayne Taylor)
 Jeremy Lindsay Taylor (Ryan Cassidy)
   Steve Adams (Father Brian)

Broadcast history
 Season 1:
 Monday to Thursdays, 6:30pm (25 minutes x 160 episodes)
 Season 2:
 Saturdays, 7:30pm (2 episodes in a 60 minute block; first 44 episodes only)
 Monday to Thursdays, 6:00 pm (25 minutes x 68 episodes)
 Season 3:
 Monday to Thursdays, 6:00 pm (25 minutes x 48 episodes)

References

External links
Official Website
Australian Television Information Archive
Something in the Air at the National Film and Sound Archive
 

Australian Broadcasting Corporation original programming
2000 Australian television series debuts
2002 Australian television series endings
Australian television soap operas
Television series by Beyond Television Productions